Gangster Story is a 1959 American crime film directed by and starring Walter Matthau. The film was edited by Radley Metzger.

This was the only film Matthau directed. He married co-star Carol Grace in 1959.

Plot summary
A mobster is hiding from the law in a small town and he's running out of money, so he robs a bank and rakes in some big bucks. However, now, not only are the cops after him, but so is the local mob boss who is jealous that an outsider pulled such a job in his territory, and especially without giving him a piece of the pie.

Cast
Walter Matthau as Jack Martin
Carol Grace as Carol Logan, Librarian
Bruce MacFarlane as Earl J. Dawson
Garry Walberg as Adolph
Raikin Ben-Ari as 'Plumber' a Hood
David Leonard as Bank President W. Palmer
John Albright as Henchman
Clegg Hoyt as Caretaker at Country Club

Soundtrack
The soundtrack for this film was in mono from the production company of Swen Productions, Inc., with or by Jonathan Daniels. See external links for TCM.

References

External links

Gangster Story at Turner Classic Movies

1960 films
1960s crime drama films
American black-and-white films
Films set in California
1960 directorial debut films
1960 drama films
1960s English-language films